John Leonard (15 November 1873 – 21 March 1938) was an Irish hurler who played with club side Redmonds and at inter-county level with the Cork senior hurling team.

Playing career

Born in Ballyphehane, Cork, Leonard first played hurling as a member of the Redmonds club. He was a member of the club's senior team when they won back-to-back County Senior Championships in 1900 and 1901. These victories earned Leonard  a call-up to the Cork senior hurling team for the 1901 Munster Championship. After being appointed  captaincy of the team, he was replaced midway through the championship but won a Munster Championship medal after a win over Clare. Leonard later lined out in Cork's defeat by London in the 1901 All-Ireland final.

Honours

Redmonds
Cork Senior Hurling Championship (2): 1900, 1901

Cork
Munster Senior Hurling Championship (1): 1901

References

1873 births
1938 deaths
Redmond's hurlers
Cork inter-county hurlers